Amery Municipal Airport  is a city owned public use airport located two nautical miles (4 km) south of the central business district of Amery, a city in Polk County, Wisconsin, United States. It is included in the Federal Aviation Administration (FAA) National Plan of Integrated Airport Systems for 2021–2025, in which it is categorized as a local general aviation facility.

The airport was damaged by high winds in September 2005. Six planes were damaged and five hangars were destroyed.

Facilities and aircraft 
Amery Municipal Airport covers an area of 218 acres (88 ha) at an elevation of 1,088 feet (332 m) above mean sea level. It has one VASI equipped runway designated 18/36 with an asphalt surface measuring 4,000 by 75 feet (1,219 x 23 m).

For the 12-month period ending July 22, 2020, the airport had 13,900 aircraft operations, an average of 38 per day: 98% general aviation, 1% air taxi and 1% military. In January 2023, there were 27 aircraft based at this airport: 23 single-engine, 1 multi-engine and 3 ultralights.

See also 
 List of airports in Wisconsin

References

External links 

 Amery Municipal (AHH) at the Wisconsin DOT Airport Directory
 

Airports in Wisconsin
Buildings and structures in Polk County, Wisconsin